Jamie Yayi Mpie (born 22 May 2001) is a Belgian professional footballer who plays as a winger or forward for Jong Genk.

Club career
Yapi Mpie started his career with Serie A side Sampdoria.

Before the second half of 2021–22, Yapi Mpie signed for Roda JC in the Dutch second tier. On 14 January 2022, he debuted for Roda JC during a 4–0 win over Almere City.

On 31 January 2023, Yayi Mpie signed a year-and-a-half contract with Jong Genk.

Personal life
Yapi Mpie was born in Belgium to a DR Congolese father and Greek mother.

References

External links
 

2001 births
People from Tongeren
Belgian people of Democratic Republic of the Congo descent 
Belgian people of Greek descent
Living people
Belgian footballers
Belgium youth international footballers
Association football wingers
Association football forwards
U.C. Sampdoria players
Roda JC Kerkrade players
Jong Genk players
Eerste Divisie players
Challenger Pro League players
Belgian expatriate footballers
Belgian expatriate sportspeople in Italy
Expatriate footballers in Italy 
Belgian expatriate sportspeople in the Netherlands
Expatriate footballers in the Netherlands